The cuneiform sign MÁ denotes a ship or boat. It is used in Sumerian and as a Sumerogram for the Akkadian word eleppu (also 'ship'/'boat'). MÁ is usually preceded by the determinative for items made of wood, namely  GIŠ: GIŠ.MÁ, or GIŠ.MÁ, .

Examples 
The Epic of Gilgamesh lists sixteen wood-related words written with the GIŠ determinative, among them GIŠ.MÁ/eleppu. The epic also uses the 'ship'/'boat' Sumerogram in Tablet XI (the Gilgamesh flood myth), and elsewhere when Gilgamesh is taken by boat.

Some of the Amarna letters using the Sumerogram are EA 86, EA 153, EA 149, EA 245, and EA 364.

See also
Amarna letter EA 86
Amarna letter EA 153
Amarna letter EA 245

References

 (Volume 1) in the original Akkadian cuneiform and transliteration; commentary and glossary are in English

External links
Amarna letter EA 153-(Obverse), line 10 (7th line from bottom).
Amarna letter EA 245-(Reverse), line 4(=line 28) (4th line from top-of-reverse).

Sumerian words and phrases
Sumerograms
Cuneiform signs